SXB or sxb may refer to:

 SXB, the IATA code for Strasbourg Airport, France
 sxb, the ISO 639-3 code for Suba language, Kenya